The Starling Girl is a 2023 American drama film directed by Laurel Parmet. The film premiered at the 2023 Sundance Film Festival on January 21, 2023 and was acquired by Bleecker Street.

Plot 
Jem Starling is a 17-year-old girl raised in a fundamentalist Christian community in Kentucky who is trying to figure out her place in the world. On one level, she aspires to be a dutiful Christian, while she is also looked up to by her younger siblings as the eldest daughter in the family. She finds joy in her church dance troupe, but her love of dance, along with her own burgeoning desires, become difficult to reconcile with her faith. Community traditions such as courting also weigh on Jem's shoulders. Amidst this confusion, she finds refuge in the encouragement of Owen, her youth pastor who has just returned from doing missionary work abroad.

Cast
 Eliza Scanlen as Jem Starling
 Lewis Pullman as Owen Taylor
 Jimmi Simpson as Paul Starling
 Wrenn Schmidt as Heidi Starling
 Austin Abrams as Ben Taylor
 Kyle Secor as Pastor Taylor

Production 
Parmet began writing the script in 2017. Her idea for the story came from research work she did in Oklahoma about Christian fundamentalist communities. From spending time with the women of these communities and attending their church, Parmet "learned that [the women] believed that their desires were sinful. There was a woman in their church who had had an affair with a church authority member and she received the blame instead of him. When I first heard these stories, I was like, 'Their world is so backwards. I’m so glad that my life’s not like this.' But the more I thought about it, the more I saw how much we actually had in common, in terms of how we grew up, our relationships with our bodies and what society teaches us to feel about our desires." Parmet also drew from her own experiences in a relationship she had as a teenager, saying she "decided that I wanted to tell a story looking back at my experience and set it in a world that, while extreme and specific, has so much in common with the culture at large.”

The film was shot in the area of Louisville, Kentucky. Production took place from May 16 to June 17, 2022.

Release 
The film premiered at the 2023 Sundance Film Festival on January 21, 2023. In February, Bleecker Street acquired North American distribution rights for the film.

Critical reception 
On review aggregator website Rotten Tomatoes, the film has an approval rating of 96% based on 26 reviews, with an average rating of 8/10. On Metacritic, it has a weighted average score of 80 out of 100 based on 10 critics, indicating "generally favorable reviews".

Critics lauded the performances and Parmet's direction. Katie Walsh of TheWrap wrote, "Parmet’s strong script and surety behind the camera navigates the audience through this complicated story of religion and sexuality, patriarchy and power, brought to eerily accurate life by the ensemble of excellent actors. Scanlen, who is always tremendous, from Little Women to Babyteeth, holds the center with ease, while Pullman proves his chops in this complex role. But Schmidt (whose accent and cadence is spot on) and Simpson just about steal the show in their supporting roles as the steely, severe Heidi and deteriorating Paul." 

David Ehrlich of IndieWire gave the film a grade of B+ and wrote though the film "tells a tale as old as time — the broad strokes of its story about the affair between a naïve teenage girl and a married older man who swears that he’ll leave his wife adhere to convention from start to finish...the power of this sensitive and devilishly detailed coming-of-age drama is rooted in the friction that it finds between biblical paternalism and modern personhood. While young women have always been taught to be ashamed of their desires...Parmet’s self-possessed debut is uncommonly well-attuned to how garbled that gospel might sound to a God-loving girl who’s been raised amid the echoes of a secular culture." In The Hollywood Reporter, Jourdain Searles wrote, "The Starling Girl is a complex, often disturbing portrait of the way women have been pressured to shrink themselves and pass on that shame to their daughters. Somewhere inside them they know it breeds unhappiness, but for them it’s a small price to pay for admittance into the kingdom of Heaven."

In The Guardian, Adrian Horton wrote Parmet succeeds in "depicting an insular religious community – a group of fundamentalist Christians in present-day Kentucky – with enough specificity and emotional acuity to bridge the gap with viewers who will find such a place opaque, unrelatable or possibly even unbelievable." Colliders Maggie Boccella wrote, "The Starling Girl is steeped with empathy, not just for Jem, but for every young woman, religious or not, who struggles to know herself and gives in to the desire to be seen, no matter the voyeur — just to feel alive, and like they matter."

The Film Stages Michael Frank wrote, "For those with a religious background, the elements of dread, wielding power over our own upbringing, our own residual guilt that sticks with one long after they’ve stopped going to church will be well-recognized. For others, it’ll be a strong showing from an up-and-coming director with two terrific, mostly quiet lead performances. Both perspectives elevate the film above standard fare depicting the dangers of fundamentalism."

References

External links 

2023 drama films
2023 films
2023 directorial debut films
2023 independent films
Films about Christianity
Films about sexual repression
Films about father–daughter relationships
Films about mother–daughter relationships
2020s coming-of-age drama films
American coming-of-age drama films
Films set in Kentucky
Films shot in Kentucky